Cyrillization of Arabic is the conversion of text written in Arabic script into Cyrillic script. Because the Arabic script is an abjad (a writing system without vowels), an accurate transliteration into Cyrillic, an alphabet, would still require prior knowledge of the subject language to read. Instead, systems of transcription have normally been used.

Further reading
 
 
 
 

Arabic
Arabic script